Thiago Barbosa Soares or simply Thiago (born December 11, 1989 in Santana do Ipanema, Alagoas) is a Brazilian footballer who plays as a defender.

External links
 Profile at zerozero.pt

1989 births
Living people
Brazilian footballers
Brazilian expatriate footballers
First Professional Football League (Bulgaria) players
PFC Lokomotiv Plovdiv players
Expatriate footballers in Bulgaria
Brazilian expatriate sportspeople in Bulgaria
People from Santana do Ipanema
Association football midfielders
Sportspeople from Alagoas